Prince Arsenije "Arsen" of Yugoslavia ( / Arsenije Karađorđević; 16/17 April 1859 – 19 October 1938) was a dynast of the House of Karađorđević and ancestor of the current cadet branch of the Royal Family which ruled Yugoslavia until 1945. He served as an officer in the Russian Army.

Biography
He was born in Timișoara a year after his father Prince Alexander Karađorđević had been deposed from the Serbian throne (the predecessor regime to the Yugoslavian monarchy). His mother was Persida Nenadović. Prince Arsen's elder brother was Peter I, King of Serbia and, later, of the Serbs, Croats and Slovenes.

Prince Arsen was married in Saint Petersburg on 1 May 1892 to Princess Aurora Pavlovna Demidova of San Donato, daughter of Pavel Pavlovich Demidov, 2nd Prince of San Donato (whose uncle, Prince Anatoly Demidov, had been first married to Princess Mathilde Bonaparte) and of Prince Pavel's second wife Princess Elena Petrovna Trubetskaya. 

Their only son was Prince Paul of Yugoslavia who was Regent of Yugoslavia from 9 October 1934 to 27 March 1941. The couple divorced on 26 December 1896 and Aurora Pavlovna was remarried to Count Nicola di Noghera in Genoa on 4 November 1897, with whom she had a daughter, Helena Aurora di Noghera (22 May 1898 – 12 October 1967). Aurora Pavlovna died in Turin on 28 June 1904.

Prince Arsen died in Paris on 19 October 1938.
thumb|100px|right|Royal Monogram of Prince Arsen of Yugoslavia

Honours and awards

Honours

See also
 Mikhail Miloradovich
 Semyon Zorich
 Anto Gvozdenović
 Marko Ivanovich Voinovich
 Matija Zmajević

References and notes

External links
 

1859 births
1937 deaths
19th-century Serbian royalty
20th-century Serbian royalty
Russian people of Serbian descent
Karađorđević dynasty
Burials at the Mausoleum of the Royal House of Karađorđević, Oplenac